In the 2010–11 season, South China has got 2 champions and 2 runners-up in the league and cups. South China is also one of the participating team for Hong Kong in AFC Cup. The team is coached by Hong Kong coach Chan Ho Yin.

Squad

Transfers

IN

Change in position

OUT

Squad statistics

Last Update：17 May 2011

Matches

Friendly Matches

Training in South Korea

2010 Asian Game Friendly

Hong Kong First Division League

References

South China AA seasons
South China Aa